The Via Sacra (Latin for Holy Road) is a centuries old pilgrimage trail in Lower Austria. It starts in Vienna and passes through the Wienerwald to Mariazell.

The trail goes from Mödling through Gaaden, Heiligenkreuz, Alland, and the pilgrimage destination Hafnerberg, first into the Triestingtal, and then over the Gerichtsberg into the Gölsental and Traisental. Along it there are many remarkable shrines. The pilgrims have been an economic factor in the area since early in its history.  There are many inns on the trail, which live off the pilgrims.

Today, the region also seeks to profit from the road.  As a result, annual concert cycles are held at the Heiligenkreuz monastery.

References
The information in this article is based on a translation of its German equivalent.

External links
 Via Sacra
 http://www.altenmarkt.co.at/ViaSacra/Via_Sacra.htm

Lower Austria
Christian pilgrimages